Janine Flock ( born 25 July 1989) is an Austrian skeleton racer. She was a participant at the 2014 Winter Olympics in Sochi. In February 2015, she became the first Austrian woman to win an overall World Cup skeleton title. She came in second at the 2016 World Championships and is regarded as the best woman skeleton racer in Austrian history.

References

External links

1989 births
Living people
Austrian female skeleton racers
Olympic skeleton racers of Austria
Skeleton racers at the 2014 Winter Olympics
Skeleton racers at the 2018 Winter Olympics
Skeleton racers at the 2022 Winter Olympics
People from Hall in Tirol
Sportspeople from Tyrol (state)
21st-century Austrian women